Corning is a city in Nemaha County, Kansas, United States.  As of the 2020 census, the population of the city was 212.

History

Corning was founded in 1857 a mile and a half distant from the present town. In 1867, Corning was moved to the site it now occupies. It was named for Erastus Corning, of New York.

Geography
Corning is located at  (39.656418, -96.030344).

Demographics

2010 census
As of the census of 2010, there were 157 people, 57 households, and 40 families residing in the city. The racial makeup of the city was 94.9% White, 2.5% Native American, 1.3% from other races, and 1.3% from two or more races. Hispanic or Latino of any race were 1.3% of the population.

There were 57 households, of which 42.1% had children under the age of 18 living with them, 59.6% were married couples living together, 7.0% had a female householder with no husband present, 3.5% had a male householder with no wife present, and 29.8% were non-families. 26.3% of all households were made up of individuals, and 10.5% had someone living alone who was 65 years of age or older. The average household size was 2.75 and the average family size was 3.43.

The median age in the city was 32.8 years. 33.1% of residents were under the age of 18; 4.5% were between the ages of 18 and 24; 30.5% were from 25 to 44; 23.6% were from 45 to 64; and 8.3% were 65 years of age or older. The gender makeup of the city was 51.6% male and 48.4% female.

2000 census
As of the census of 2000, there were 170 people, 64 households, and 41 families residing in the city. The racial makeup of the city was 96.47% White, 1.76% Native American, 1.18% Pacific Islander, 0.59% from other races. Hispanic or Latino of any race were 0.59% of the population.

There were 64 households, out of which 46.9% had children under the age of 18 living with them, 51.6% were married couples living together, 10.9% had a female householder with no husband present, and 34.4% were non-families. 29.7% of all households were made up of individuals, and 15.6% had someone living alone who was 65 years of age or older. The average household size was 2.66 and the average family size was 3.40.

In the city, the population was spread out, with 35.9% under the age of 18, 10.0% from 18 to 24, 27.1% from 25 to 44, 15.9% from 45 to 64, and 11.2% who were 65 years of age or older. The median age was 28 years. For every 100 females, there were 91.0 males. For every 100 females age 18 and over, there were 87.9 males.

The median income for a household in the city was $27,250, and the median income for a family was $32,500. Males had a median income of $26,250 versus $17,083 for females. The per capita income for the city was $10,135. About 6.8% of families and 10.2% of the population were below the poverty line, including 4.8% of those under the age of eighteen and 15.4% of those 65 or over.

See also
 Central Branch Union Pacific Railroad

References

External links

 Corning - Directory of Public Officials
 USD 380, local school district
 Corning city map, KDOT

Cities in Kansas
Cities in Nemaha County, Kansas
1857 establishments in Kansas Territory